Teresa Ruiz may refer to:

Terele Pávez (1939-2017), born Teresa Parta Ruiz Penella, Spanish actress
Teresa Ruiz (actress) (born 1988), Mexican actress
Teresa Ruiz (politician) (born 1974), member of the New Jersey Senate